Kurtutel (Qırtütäl) is a rural locality (a village) in Ziriklinsky Selsoviet, Sharansky District, Bashkortostan, Russia. The population was 176 as of 2010. There are 2 streets.

Geography 
Kurtutel is located 27 km northwest of Sharan (the district's administrative centre) by road. Tallykul is the nearest rural locality.

References 

Rural localities in Sharansky District